Mary Adams (born 23 November 1952) is an American politician. She is a Democrat representing District 43 in the North Dakota House of Representatives.

Biography
Adams was born on November 23, 1952. She worked as a realtor at Crary Homes & Real Estate.

In 2018, Adams announced her candidacy for state representative. She and fellow Democrat Matt Eidson won the November general election. She took office on December 1, 2018.

Adams is married to Steve. They have two children and reside in Grand Forks, North Dakota.

References

External links
Representative Mary Adams – North Dakota Legislative Branch

1952 births
Living people
People from Grand Forks, North Dakota
21st-century American politicians
21st-century American women politicians
Women state legislators in North Dakota
Democratic Party members of the North Dakota House of Representatives